Dedham is a city in Carroll County, Iowa, United States. The population was 224 at the time of the 2020 census.

History
Dedham got its start in the year 1881, following construction of the Chicago, Milwaukee and St. Paul Railway through that territory. It was named for Dedham, Massachusetts.

St. Joseph Parish was founded in 1891 by German and English Catholics. They built the first church in 1892 with a new, larger church coming in 1904. The present church was dedicated on October 1, 1940, by Bishop Edmond Heelan.

Geography
Dedham is located at  (41.908650, -94.822832) at the junction of Brushy and Dedham Creeks.

Government and politics
Dedham operates under a mayor-council government. The Mayor is Robert Sporrer. Along with the mayor is the five person city council. Councilpersons are: Christopher John Hoffman, Mike Heinrichs, Rod Smith, Tony Derner, and Tony Seidl. The City Clerk is Heather Badding. City elections are held every two odd numbered years. The mayor serves a two-year term, while the members of the council serve four-year terms.

Past mayors

Demographics

2010 census
As of the census of 2010, there were 266 people, 101 households, and 65 families residing in the city. The racial makeup of the city was 100.0% White. Hispanic or Latino of any race were 0.4% of the population.

There were 101 households, of which 36.6% had children under the age of 18 living with them, 55.4% were married couples living together, 5.0% had a female householder with no husband present, 4.0% had a male householder with no wife present, and 35.6% were non-families. 30.7% of all households were made up of individuals, and 14.8% had someone living alone who was 65 years of age or older. The average household size was 2.63 and the average family size was 3.32.

The median age in the city was 32.3 years. 29.7% of residents were under the age of 18; 9.1% were between the ages of 18 and 24; 24.4% were from 25 to 44; 21.4% were from 45 to 64; and 15.4% were 65 years of age or older. The gender makeup of the city was 48.5% male and 51.5% female.

2000 census
As of the census of 2000, there were 270 people, 112 households, and 68 families residing in the city. The racial makeup of the city was 100.00% White. Hispanic or Latino of any race were 1.07% of the population.

There were 113 households, out of which 31.9% had children under the age of 18 living with them, 51.3% were married couples living together, 7.1% had a female householder with no husband present, and 38.9% were non-families. 36.3% of all households were made up of individuals, and 19.5% had someone living alone who was 65 years of age or older. The average household size was 2.48 and the average family size was 3.23.

In the city, the population was spread out, with 28.2% under the age of 18, 8.2% from 18 to 24, 24.6% from 25 to 44, 18.6% from 45 to 64, and 20.4% who were 65 years of age or older. The median age was 36 years. For every 100 females, there were 105.9 males. For every 100 females age 18 and over, there were 103.0 males.

The median income for a household in the city was $33,125, and the median income for a family was $37,639. Males had a median income of $25,000 versus $15,417 for females. The per capita income for the city was $13,505. About 7.9% of families and 9.9% of the population were below the poverty line, including 15.3% of those under the age of eighteen and 9.4% of those 65 or over.

Education 
The public school district is the Carroll Community School District.

References

Works cited

Cities in Carroll County, Iowa
Cities in Iowa
1881 establishments in Iowa